In logic, specifically in deductive reasoning, an argument is valid if and only if it takes a form that makes it impossible for the premises to be true and the conclusion nevertheless to be false. It is not required for a valid argument to have premises that are actually true, but to have premises that, if they were true, would guarantee the truth of the argument's conclusion. Valid arguments must be clearly expressed by means of sentences called well-formed formulas (also called wffs or simply formulas). 

The validity of an argument can be tested, proved or disproved, and depends on its logical form.

Arguments

In logic, an argument is a set of statements expressing the premises (whatever consists of  empirical evidences and axiomatic truths) and an evidence-based conclusion.

An argument is valid if and only if it would be contradictory for the conclusion to be false if all of the premises are true. Validity doesn't require the truth of the premises, instead it merely necessitates that conclusion follows from the formers without violating the correctness of the logical form. If also the premises of a valid argument are proven true, this is said to be sound.   

The corresponding conditional of a valid argument is a logical truth and the negation of its corresponding conditional is a contradiction. The conclusion is a logical consequence of its premises.

An argument that is not valid is said to be "invalid".

An example of a valid (and sound) argument is given by the following well-known syllogism:
 All men are mortal. (True)
 Socrates is a man. (True)
 Therefore, Socrates is mortal. (True)

What makes this a valid argument is not that it has true premises and a true conclusion, but the logical necessity of the conclusion, given the two premises. The argument would be just as valid were the premises and conclusion false. The following argument is of the same logical form but with false premises and a false conclusion, and it is equally valid:

 All cups are green. (False)
 Socrates is a cup. (False)
 Therefore, Socrates is green. (False)

No matter how the universe might be constructed, it could never be the case that these arguments should turn out to have simultaneously true premises but a false conclusion. The above arguments may be contrasted with the following invalid one:

 All men are immortal. (False)
 Socrates is a man. (True)
 Therefore, Socrates is mortal. (True)

In this case, the conclusion contradicts the deductive logic of the preceding premises, rather than deriving from it. Therefore, the argument is logically 'invalid', even though the conclusion could be considered 'true' in general terms. The premise 'All men are immortal' would likewise be deemed false outside of the framework of classical logic. However, within that system 'true' and 'false' essentially function more like mathematical states such as binary 1s and 0s than the philosophical concepts normally associated with those terms.

A standard view is that whether an argument is valid is a matter of the argument's logical form.  Many techniques are employed by logicians to represent an argument's logical form.  A simple example, applied to two of the above illustrations, is the following:  Let the letters 'P', 'Q', and 'S' stand, respectively, for the set of men, the set of mortals, and Socrates.  Using these symbols, the first argument may be abbreviated as:

 All P are Q.
 S is a P.
 Therefore, S is a Q.

Similarly, the second argument becomes:

 No P's are Q.
 S is a P.
 Therefore, S is not a Q.

An argument is termed formally valid if it has structural self-consistency, i.e. if when the operands between premises are all true, the derived conclusion is always also true. In the third example, the initial premises cannot logically result in the conclusion and is therefore categorized as an invalid argument.

Valid formula
A formula of a formal language is a valid formula if and only if it is true under every possible interpretation of the language. In propositional logic, they are tautologies.

Statements
A statement can be called valid, i.e. logical truth, if it is true in all interpretations.

Soundness

Validity of deduction is not affected by the truth of the premise or the truth of the conclusion. The following deduction is perfectly valid:

 All animals live on Mars. (False)
 All humans are animals. (True)
 Therefore, all humans live on Mars. (False)

The problem with the argument is that it is not sound.  In order for a deductive argument to be sound, the argument must be valid and all the premises must be true.

Satisfiability

Model theory analyzes formulae with respect to particular classes of interpretation in suitable mathematical structures.  On this reading, formula is valid if all such interpretations make it true.  An inference is valid if all interpretations that validate the premises validate the conclusion.  This is known as semantic validity.

Preservation
In truth-preserving validity, the interpretation under which all variables are assigned a truth value of 'true' produces a truth value of 'true'.

In a false-preserving validity, the interpretation under which all variables are assigned a truth value of 'false' produces a truth value of 'false'.

{| class="wikitable" style="text-align:left"
! Preservation properties !! Logical connective sentences
|-
|True and false preserving: || Proposition   Logical conjunction (AND)   Logical disjunction (OR)
|-
|True preserving only: || Tautology  Biconditional (XNOR)  Implication  Converse implication
|-
|False preserving only: || Contradiction Exclusive disjunction (XOR)  Nonimplication  Converse nonimplication
|-
|Non-preserving: || Negation  Alternative denial (NAND)Joint denial (NOR)
|}

See also

Logical consequence
Reductio ad absurdum
Mathematical fallacy
Soundness
Ω-validity

References

Further reading
Barwise, Jon; Etchemendy, John. Language, Proof and Logic (1999): 42.
Beer, Francis A. "Validities: A Political Science Perspective", Social Epistemology 7, 1 (1993): 85-105.

Arguments
Concepts in logic
Deductive reasoning
Logical truth